The leader of the Scottish Conservative Party (officially the leader of the Scottish Conservative and Unionist Party) is the highest position within the Scottish Conservative Party.  The current holder of the position is Douglas Ross, who was elected to the position on 5 August 2020, replacing Jackson Carlaw.

When the Scottish Conservative Party is in Scottish Government, the leader would usually become the First Minister of Scotland as well as appointing the Scottish cabinet.

Leaders of the party

 Douglas Ross (since 5 August 2020)
 Jackson Carlaw (2019–2020)
 Ruth Davidson (November 2011–2019)

References

Scottish Conservative Party
Scottish Conservative Party